The women's heptathlon at the 2013 Asian Athletics Championships was held at the Shree Shiv Chhatrapati Sports Complex on 5–6 July.

Results

References
Results

Heptathlon
Combined events at the Asian Athletics Championships
2013 in women's athletics